Quimby is an English surname derived from a toponym such as Quenby. Notable people with the surname include:

 Darius Quimby (died 1791), first American law enforcement officer killed in line of duty
 Edith Quimby  (1891–1982), American medical researcher and physicist
 Fred Quimby (1886–1965), American cartoon producer, best known as a producer of Tom and Jerry and Tex Avery cartoons.
 Harriet Quimby (1875–1912), the first female pilot in the United States
 Phineas Quimby (1802–1866), American philosopher
 Robert Quimby (born 1976), American astronomer 
 Roxanne Quimby (born 1950), American businesswoman and philanthropist
 Shirley Leon Quimby (1893–1986), American physicist
 William R. "Bill" Quimby (born 1936), American author

Fictional characters
 Ramona Quimby and Beezus Quimby, in a series of children's books by Beverly Cleary
 Mayor Quimby, in the animated TV series The Simpsons
 Police Chief Quimby, in the Inspector Gadget series
 Fletcher Quimby, in a Disney Channel Original series A.N.T. Farm

References

English-language surnames
English toponymic surnames